Ángel Rodríguez may refer to:

 Ángel Manuel Rodríguez, Seventh-day Adventist theologian
 Ángel Rodríguez Lozano (born 1952), Spanish radio journalist and popularizer of science
 Ángel Rodríguez (footballer, born 1879), founder and first president of the Real Club Deportivo Español
 Ángel Rodríguez (footballer, born 1972), Spanish footballer and manager
 Ángel Rodríguez (footballer, born 1987), Spanish footballer
 Gary Rodríguez (Angel Rodríguez Miranda, born 1977), Puerto Rican politician
 Ángel Rodríguez (motorcyclist) (born 1985), Spanish motorcycle racer
 Ángel Rodríguez (boxer), Argentinian boxer
 Ángel M. Rodríguez Otero, Puerto Rican politician 
 Ángel David Rodríguez (born 1980), Spanish sprinter
 Angel Rodriguez (film), a 2005 film
 Ángel Rodríguez (basketball) (born 1992), Puerto Rican college basketball player
 Ángel Rodríguez (footballer, born 1992), Uruguayan footballer

See also
 Miguel Ángel Rodríguez (disambiguation)